Karuna Shaha (née Ghosh; 1 January 1921 – 5 May 1996) was an Indian artist. She was among the first few women to study at the Government School of Art in Calcutta. Shaha is well known for her nude studies in various mediums.

Early life and education 
Karuna was born on 1 January 1921 in Calcutta, Bengal Presidency (now Kolkata, West Bengal). From a very young age, she was trained in painting and singing at home by art and music tutors. One of her teachers in art was O. C. Gangoly, who informed her parents about the new opening for girls in Government School of Art (now the Government College of Art & Craft). He further insisted her to pursue a formal art course if she wanted to become an artist. Subsequently, Karuna joined the art school after completing her matriculation from Beltala Girls’ School in 1939. As a result, she was among the first group of women students to join in the Government School of Art, Calcutta from where she graduated in 1949.

Career

Art

Early years 
In 1948, Karuna won her first award at the annual student exhibition of the Government School of Art organized at the Academy of Fine Arts, Kolkata. The following year, her postage stamp design of the gateway of the Sanchi Stupa was selected and awarded in a pan India competition. She also received several accolades for her poster, book cover and letter design at the ‘Art in Industry’ exhibition. A major assignment came her way in 1950 when she was asked to design a special nine feet-long alpana for the sets of the Jean Renoir film, The River. In the 50s, Karuna continued to work mainly on head and figure studies in various mediums, which was to become her forte.

Studies in Italy 
Shaha visited Florence, Italy after she received a scholarship from the Italian government. She studied at the Accademia di Belle Arti di Firenze from 1959 to 1962 and received a diploma in fresco and mural painting. During this time, she also got a chance to visit several other galleries and museums across Europe. Her studio training at the academy as well as studies of European masters further developed her interest in human figures, especially the nude. Back from Italy in 1962, Shaha gained a reputation in Calcutta as 'the lady who paints nudes'.

Later years 
Following her return from Italy, Shaha tried her hand at some commercial art ventures. In partnership with another artist, she began her own commercial art agency, called Unit 62 which folded up soon after. Her stint in another advertising agency was short lived as well. Later, she found a stable career option in school teaching. In 1964, she joined the newly-opened Modern High School for Girls, where she taught full-time until her retirement in 1988.
With a plan to build a community for women artists of the time, Shaha spearheaded the formation of The Group, an artist collective which initially included Meera Mukherjee, Shanu Lahiri, Santosh Rohatgi and Shyamasree Basu. Their inaugural show was held in 1983 at the Academy of Fine Arts, Kolkata. The Group continued to exhibit in Kolkata, Delhi and Mumbai in the subsequent years. By the 1990s, Shaha's compositions became more surrealistic and largely depicted social symbolism.

Music 
Along with her studies at the art school, Karuna had become an accomplished classical vocalist while training under teachers like Hirendra Goswami and Sachin Das Motilal. This was followed by playback singing for Bengali movies. Between 1944 and 1946, her singing ventures also brought her in touch with the Indian People's Theatre Association. She toured and performed in different areas with this troupe. Over time, she also became a regular participant in the All India Radio programmes, and two of her Rabindra Sangeet records were released by His Master's Voice.

Personal life 
In 1946, Karuna had married Shambhu Shaha, a photographer known for his photos of Rabindranath Tagore and Santiniketan. They had one daughter, Chandrima Shaha who is a renowned biologist.

Death and legacy 
Shaha died on 5 May 1996. A retrospective of her works was organized at the Art Heritage Gallery, New Delhi in 1996-97. Introducing Karuna in the exhibition catalogue, art critic Prasant Daw wrote, ‘No discussion of contemporary art in India would be complete without reference to the valuable contribution made by Karuna Shaha, one of the most forthright and fearless women artists of Bengal.’

References 

1921 births
1996 deaths
Indian women painters
Government College of Art & Craft alumni
Women artists from West Bengal
20th-century Indian painters
Artists from Kolkata
Indian art educators
Painters from West Bengal
Women educators from West Bengal
Singers from West Bengal